|}
George Eric Manuell (born 28 April 1941) is a former Australian politician. He was the Country Liberal Party member for Alice Springs in the Northern Territory Legislative Assembly from 1976 to 1977.

References

1941 births
Living people
Members of the Northern Territory Legislative Assembly
Country Liberal Party members of the Northern Territory Legislative Assembly